Stepan Romanovich Sannikov (born September 25, 1990 in Solikamsk) is a Russian professional ice hockey forward who is currently under contract with Salavat Yulaev Ufa of the Kontinental Hockey League (KHL). He previously played for Ak Bars Kazan of the Kontinental Hockey League (KHL). He initially spent the first 11 years of his professional career within HC Sibir Novosibirsk.

References

External links

1990 births
Living people
People from Solikamsk
Sportspeople from Perm Krai
Russian ice hockey left wingers
Ak Bars Kazan players
Lokomotiv Yaroslavl players
Salavat Yulaev Ufa players
HC Sibir Novosibirsk players
Sibirskie Snaipery players
Zauralie Kurgan players